Spyridium obcordatum, commonly known as creeping spyridium or creeping dustymiller, is a species of flowering plant in the family Rhamnaceae and is endemic to Tasmania. It is a prostrate shrub with heart-shaped leaves, the narrower end towards the base, and clusters of hairy, white flowers.

Description
The upper surface of the leaves is more or less glabrous and the lower surface is covered with greyish or white hairs. Flowering occurs from mid-September to October.

Taxonomy
This species was first formally described in 1855 by Joseph Dalton Hooker who gave it the name Cryptandra obcordata in The botany of the Antarctic voyage of H.M. Discovery ships Erebus and Terror from specimens collected by Ronald Campbell Gunn. In 1970, Winifred Curtis changed the name to Spyridium obcordatum in The Victorian Naturalist. The specific epithet (obcordatum) means "heart-shaped, attached at the pointed end".

Distribution and habitat
Spyridium obcordatum grows in open forest or woodland, mainly among serpentinite outcrops, near Beaconsfield and in near-coastal areas between Greens Beach and Hawley Beach in Tasmania.

Conservation status
This species of spyridium is listed as "vulnerable" under the Australian Government Environment Protection and Biodiversity Conservation Act 1999 and the Tasmanian Government Threatened Species Protection Act 1995. The main threats to the species include habitat disturbance, browsing and grazing, and residential activity.

References

obcordatum
Rosales of Australia
Flora of Tasmania
Taxa named by Joseph Dalton Hooker
Plants described in 1855